Andrew Jackson (1767–1845) was the president of the United States from 1829 to 1837.

Andrew Jackson or Andy Jackson may also refer to:

People

Arts and entertainment
Andy Jackson (recording engineer), recording engineer
Andrew Jackson (actor) (born 1963), Canadian actor
Andrew Jackson (visual effects), Australian visual effects artist

Sports
Andrew Jackson (footballer) (1856–1930), Scottish international footballer
Andrew Jackson (baseball) (1865–1900), African-American baseball player
Andy Jackson (footballer, born 1890) (1890–1918), Scottish footballer (Middlesbrough FC)
Andy Jackson (tennis) (born 1961), head coach of the Division I Florida Gators men's tennis team
Andrew Jackson (running back) (born 1964), American football running back for the Houston Oilers
Andy Jackson (cricketer) (born 1979), Trinidadian cricketer
Andy Jackson (footballer, born 1988), Scottish-born Irish footballer
Andrew Jackson (linebacker) (born 1992), American football linebacker

Others
Andrew B. Jackson (1814–1878), American pioneer and territorial legislator
Andrew Jackson (pastor) (1828–1901), Swedish-born American pastor
Andrew Jackson (Michigan politician) (1844–1899), Michigan politician and soldier
Andrew O. Jackson (born 1941), American plant virologist

Sculptures 
 Equestrian statue of Andrew Jackson (Washington, D.C.), 1852 equestrian statue by Clark Mills in Lafayette Square, Washington, D.C.
 Statue of Andrew Jackson (U.S. Capitol), 1928 bronze sculpture by Belle Kinney Scholz and Leopold Scholz in the US Capitol in Washington D.C.

Other uses 
Andrew Jackson (clipper), clipper ship
USS Andrew Jackson, ship
USS Andrew Jackson (SSBN-619), submarine
Andrew Jackson, Alabama, unincorporated community in Tallapoosa County, Alabama
 Andrew Jackson, character in An Almost Perfect Affair

See also
Andrew Jackson University, private university
Andrew Jackson Donelson (1799–1871), nephew and secretary of President Jackson
Andrew Jackson Jihad, band
Drew Jackson (born 1993), American baseball player
Andrew J. Van Vorhes (Andrew Jackson Van Vorhes, 1824–1873), American politician and newspaper editor

Jackson, Andrew